Peter Duggan (born September 1993) is an Irish hurler who plays for Clare Senior Championship club Clooney-Quin and at inter-county level with the Clare senior hurling team. He usually lines out as a right wing-forward.

Playing career

Clooney-Quin

Duggan joined the Clooney-Quin club at a young age and played in all grades at juvenile and underage levels before eventually progressing onto the club's senior team.

On 15 October 2017, Duggan was named at left wing-forward but played at full-forward when Clooney-Quin qualified for their first Clare Senior Championship final in 73 years. He scored ten points, including a last minute free to secure a 1-16 to 0-19 draw with Sixmilebridge. Duggan top scored again with ten points in the replay, however, Clooney-Quin were defeated by 1-20 to 1-14.

Clare

Minor and under-21

Duggan first played for Clare as a member of the minor team. He made his first appearance on 27 April 2011 when he was introduced as a half-time substitute for Frank Melody in a 6-24 to 1-08 defeat of Kerry in the Munster Championship. On 10 July, Duggan scored a point from left wing-forward when Clare defeated Waterford by 1-20 to 3-09 in the Munster Championship final.

On 19 July 2012, Duggan made his first appearance for the Clare under-21 team when he came on as a substitute for Tony Kelly in a 2-22 to 0-09 Munster Championship defeat of Waterford. On 8 August, he won his first Munster Championship medal when he came on as a substitute in Clare's 1-16 to 1-14 defeat of Tipperary in the final. On 15 September, Duggan started the All-Ireland final on the bench but came on as a substitute for Aaron Cunningham in the 2-17 to 2-11 defeat of Kilkenny.

Duggan became a regular member of the Clare under-21 starting fifteen during the 2013 Munster Championship. On 7 August, he won his second successive Munster Championship medal after scoring a goal in Clare's 1-17 to 2-10 defeat of Tipperary in the final. On 14 September, Duggan won his second successive All-Ireland medal, in spite of being held scoreless, following Clare's 2-28 to 0-12 defeat of Antrim in the final.

On 30 July 2014, Duggan won a third successive Munster Championship medal after scoring two points from right wing-forward in Clare's 1-28 to 1-13 defeat of Cork in the final. He was switched to left wing-forward for the All-Ireland final against Wexford on 13 September 2014. Duggan was held scoreless but won a third successive All-Ireland Championship medal after the 2-20 to 3-11 victory.

Senior

Duggan was called up to the Clare senior hurling team by Davy Fitzgerald in 2012. He made his first appearance on 7 February in a 2-13 to 1-13 defeat of Limerick in the pre-season Waterford Crystal Cup. Duggan was an unused substitute for the subsequent National Hurling League and All-Ireland Championship campaigns.

On 10 February 2013, Duggan claimed his first silverware when Clare defeated Tipperary by 1-21 to 1-13 to win the Waterford Crystal Cup. He made his first National League appearance on 14 April in a 0-31 to 2-23 defeat of Cork. On 2 June, Duggan made his first Munster Championship appearance when he came on as a 29th-minute substitute for Séadna Morey in a 2-20 to 1-15 defeat of Waterford. On 8 September, he was an unused substitute in the 0-25 to 3-16 draw with Cork in the All-Ireland final. Duggan was again an unused substitute for the replay on 28 September. In spite of remaining on the bench he won an All-Ireland medal after a 5-16 to 3-16 victory.

On 23 January 2016, Duggan scored three points when Clare defeated Limerick by 0-18 to 0-17 to win the inaugural Munster League. On 1 May, he scored a point from right wing-forward in Clare's 0-22 apiece draw with Waterford in the National League final. Duggan was dropped for the replay on 8 May, however, he won a National League medal as a non-playing substitute following Clare's 1-23 to 2-19 defeat of Waterford.

On 9 July 2017, Duggan lined out in his first Munster Championship final. After starting the game on the bench he was introduced as a 65th-minute substitute for Cathal Malone in the 1-25 to 1-20 defeat by Cork. 

On 1 July 2018, Duggan top scored with 1-07 for Clare in their 2-24 to 3-19 defeat by Cork in the Munster Championship final. On 8 August, he was voted as the PwC GAA/GPA Player of the Month for July as a result of his "outstanding form throughout this championship". Duggan, who ended the championship as top scorer with 3-76, was later named in the right wing-forward position on the All-Star team.

Career statistics

Honours

Team

Clare
 All-Ireland Senior Hurling Championship (1): 2013
 National Hurling League (1): 2016
 Munster Senior Hurling League (1): 2016
 Waterford Crystal Cup (1): 2013
 All-Ireland Under-21 Hurling Championship (3): 2012, 2013, 2014
 Munster Under-21 Hurling Championship (3): 2012, 2013, 2014
 Munster Minor Hurling Championship (1): 2011

Individual

Awards
 GAA GPA All Stars Awards (1): 2018
 GAA/GPA Player of the Month (1): July 2018

Records

Clare
Overall top championship scorer: 2018

References

1993 births
Living people
Clooney-Quin hurlers
Clare inter-county hurlers
Alumni of Limerick Institute of Technology